The Miyamoto Musashi Budokan (a budōkan (武 道 館) is a dōjō (道場) where budō (武 道) is practiced, the word kan (館) means "house") built in the province of Mimasaka in Ōhara-Cho cradle of Miyamoto Musashi (March 12, 1584, Ōhara-Chō - May 19, 1645) was inaugurated on May 20, 2000 for the anniversary of his death. This budokan is dedicated to the official martial arts of Japan. It brings together all the saber and kendo traditional schools. All Japanese martial arts are called to this precinct, the heart of traditional Japan. This budokan achieves the unification of martial disciplines not only in practice but also historically and culturally. The inauguration took place in the presence of many Japanese officials including Sensei Tadashi Chihara guarantor and tenth of the line of Miyamoto Musashi (who was at the initiative of the building), the mayor of Ōhara-Cho Fukuda Yoshiaki, Élisabeth Lamure mayor of Gleizé, and several saber and kendo schools representative of traditional and contemporary Japan.

Infrastructure 
The main arena on the first floor can receive six kendo courts. The second floor contains 838 spectator seats. International kendo competitions are regularly organized there.

 Main arena 1,376 m2 (42 m x 32 m), (139 ft x 105 ft) 
 6 kendo (11 m x 11 m), (36 ft x 36 ft)
 2 volleyball
 1 basketball
 8 badminton

 Room dedicated to Budo 322 m2 (23 m x 14 m), (75 ft x 46 ft) 
 2 Kendo (9 m x 9 m), (29 ft x 29 ft)
 2 Judo

Auxiliary facilities: training room, meeting room, fitness room, health / physical consultation room, rest room, equipment depot, changing rooms, shower rooms, room dedicated to broadcasting, offices

Architecture 
The project was designed by Sensei Tadashi Chihara guarantor and tenth of the line of Miyamoto Musashi. The architectural design of the Miyamoto Musashi Budokan was entrusted to Wataru Numata.

The structure of the main arena surrounded by two floors above the ground is made of reinforced concrete. The total floor area is 6049 m2 (the first floor of 4252 m2 and the second floor 1797 m2). The building has been certified by Heart Building.

This Budokan represents a samurai helmet or kabuto symbol of the Okayama prefecture and recalls the label as well as the central personality of the Japanese culture and native of the country, Musashi.

The delivery took place in May 2000 preceding the inauguration of May 20, 2000, in memory of the anniversary date of Miyamoto Musashi (March 12, 1584, Ōhara-Chō - May 19, 1645).

Access by transport 
Chizu Express, Chizu Line, Miyamoto Musashi Station 10 minutes on foot.

References 

Dōjō
2000 establishments in Japan
Miyamoto Musashi
Mimasaka, Okayama